Bong is a county in the north-central portion of the West African nation of Liberia. One of 15 counties that comprise the first-level of administrative division in the nation, it has twelve districts. Gbarnga serves as the capital. The area of the county measures . As of the 2008 Census, it had a population of 328,919, making it the third-most populous county in Liberia.  The county was organized in 1964 and is important for its mining industry.

Named after Mount Bong in the southern portion of the county, it is bordered by Lofa and Gbarpolu counties to the north, Margibi and Montserrado counties to the west, Grand Bassa County to the south, and Nimba County to the east. The northeast part of Bong borders the nation of Guinea. In 2008, the County Superintendent was Ranney Jackson. Bong County's flag is purple, signifying the dawn, and orange, signifying the County's newness. The two geological instruments in the white field portion of the flag symbolize Bong County's mining industry.

Geography
Bong County is situated in the central part of Liberia.  The main paved road that runs from Monrovia to Sanniquellie in Nimba County traverses Bong County.

Districts
Bong County has twelve districts (2008 population):

Boinsen District (8,352)
Fuamah District (27,784)
Jorquelleh District (78,803)
Kokoyah District (3,707)
Kpaai District (25,127)
Panta District (16,326)
Salala District (41,982)
Sanayea District (30,932)
Suakoko District (28,277)
Tukpahblee (11,767)
Yeallequellah (36,919)
Zota District (18,943)

Demographics
The population of Bong from the 1984 Census was 255,813 for the  county. In July 2005, the population was estimated to be around 804,000. In 2008, the Census placed the figure at 328,919, ranking it third in Liberia after Montserrado and Nimba. The main ethnic groups include the Kpelle, Mandingo (who are mostly Muslim), and Mano.

Education
Cuttington University is a private institution established in the late 19th century by the Episcopal Church of the US as part of its educational mission in Liberia.

Politics
Bong County is represented in the Senate by Henrique Tokpa, The former Cuttington University President, and also the former Minister of Internal Affairs

History
Bong County was created in 1964, along with Nimba, Lofa and Grand Gedeh, when the administrative sub-divisions of Liberia were increased to a total of thirteen. The capital is Gbarnga, named after an old farm in the location. Gbarnga was used by Charles Taylor as the base for his rebellion against the Presidency of Samuel Doe in the early 1990s. Having failed to capture Monrovia, in early 1991, he established an unofficial provisional government (the (National Patriotic Reconstruction Assembly Government, or NPRAG) after ECOMOG forces arrived for peacekeeping and were based in the Liberian capital. NPRAG continued to operate out of Gbarnga until 1994.

See also
2014 Ebola virus epidemic in Liberia

References

External links 
 Cuttington Chronicle - Student Newspaper
 US-based United Bong County Association website
 United Bong County Association - Bong County factsheet
 July 2005 Profile of Bong County - UNMIL
 The Bong Town community on the web
 Place name codes

 
Counties of Liberia
1964 establishments in Liberia